Yuriy Martynyuk (born 9 October 1974 in Kharkiv) is a former Ukrainian footballer and football manager.

References

External links 
 
 

1974 births
Living people
Footballers from Kharkiv
Ukrainian footballers
Ukrainian football managers
FC Tiraspol players
FC Arsenal Kharkiv players
FC Stal Kamianske players
FC Hazovyk-KhGV Kharkiv players
FC Lokomotyv Dvorichna players
FC Ekibastuz players
FC Solli Plyus Kharkiv players
FC Stal Kamianske managers
Ukrainian expatriate footballers
Expatriate footballers in Moldova
Expatriate footballers in Kazakhstan
Association football forwards